Alocasia zebrina, commonly known as the zebra plant or zebrina alocasia, is a plant in the family Araceae. It is endemic to the islands of Luzon, Mindanao, Leyte, Samar, Biliran, and Alabat in the Philippines. It is commonly grown as an ornamental plant worldwide. It is also locally known as gabing tigre ("tiger taro") in Tagalog. It is nationally listed as a threatened species and collection of A. zebrina from the wild is illegal in the Philippines.

Taxonomy and etymology
Alocasia zebrina was first described by the British horticulturist John Gould Veitch in 1862 from specimens collected from the Philippines. It is named after its distinctive striped leaf stalks.

Description
It usually has several leaves with cataphylls. It is bisected at the base into two triangular to ovate lobes. It is a rich glossy green with a leathery texture. The fruits are orange in color.

Distribution
Alocasia zebrina is endemic to the islands of Luzon, Mindanao, Leyte, Samar, Biliran, and Alabat in the Philippines. It is commonly grown as an ornamental plant worldwide.

Uses
The plant is easily propagated by stem cuttings and seeds and is a popular ornamental in both the local and international markets.

Conservation
Alocasia zebrina has not been evaluated by the International Union for Conservation of Nature Red List of Threatened Species. But it is included in the National List of Threatened Species of the Department of Environment and Natural Resources of the Philippines. Harvesting wild specimens of A. zebrina is illegal in the Philippines and is punishable with six to ten years imprisonment and a fine of ₱100,000 to ₱1,000,000.

See also

Alocasia sanderiana
Alocasia micholitziana
Alocasia nycteris
Alocasia sinuata
Alocasia heterophylla
List of threatened species of the Philippines

References

zebrina
Endemic flora of the Philippines
Flora of Luzon
Flora of Mindanao
Flora of the Visayas
Garden plants of Asia
House plants
Plants described in 1862